The New Zealand women cricket team toured Australia in February 2017. The tour consisted of a series of three Women's Twenty20 International (WT20Is). Immediately after completion of the T20 series both teams faced each other for the Rose bowl in New Zealand in a 3-match WODI series. New Zealand Women won the WT20I series by 2–1.

Squads

Ahead of the tour, Sophie Devine was ruled out of New Zealand's squad due to injury and was replaced by Anna Peterson. Sarah Aley was added to Australia's squad as cover for Lauren Cheatle. Leigh Kasperek was ruled out of the rest of the series after an injury in the first match. She was replaced by Amelia Kerr.

WT20I series

1st WT20I

2nd WT20I

3rd WT20I

References

External links
 Series home at ESPN Cricinfo

New Zealand 2016-17
Australia 2016-17
International cricket competitions in 2016–17
2016–17 Australian women's cricket season
2017 in New Zealand cricket
cricket
2017 in women's cricket